Nijangal (English: Truths) is a 2011-2014 216-part Singaporean Tamil Drama,  on MediaCorp Vasantham. The series was on air from 21 November 2011 till 21 April 2014.

Character
Akhil
Young, talented and ambitious, Akhil has emerged from his adolescent problems as a winner and a survivor. He overcame all obstacles and even death to realise his dreams of being a successful dancer and a choreographer. Now he has the support and love of his family, but dreams do not last forever and he is about to realise that.
Raj & Devi
Life is never without battles and Raj's family learns this the hard way. Raj and Devi, they appear to be the perfect couple, but there are secrets between them.
Previously, Devi found out about Raj's extra-marital affair, which begot him Madhu, the adopted daughter she brought up as her own. After a year of separation, Devi found it in her heart to forgive Raj and to continue living with him.
Now, Raj is happy and is determined to make it up to Devi for as long as they live.
Hari & Yamuna
Hari and Yamuna, they fell in love with each other, got married and settled down. Life seems made for them, but it is far from that. Yamuna forgave Hari for his illicit affair with her best friend - Lalitha. In a twisted turn of events, Lalitha was killed by her boyfriend, Deepak. After much deliberation, Yamuna was willing to work things out and start a family with Hari. They have an adorable daughter now, whom everyone dotes on. It seems like the worst of their problems are over. But trust, they say, is irreparable once broken.
Madhu
Madhu is on her way to realising her dreams of becoming a doctor. She is in her third year of medicine and is a fully dedicated student.
She went through emotional times in her teen years, having discovered that she's the lovechild of her father's affair. The emotional toll on her was so great that she lost her placing as a top student and her focus.
Madhu is now much stronger and focused than ever. But life is never without battles. Madhu is about to face another.

Nijangal 2
It's been six years since Raj's family overcame a tumultuous period of scandals, lies and even impending death. But through thick and thin, they managed to stay together and came out of it unscathed - almost.

But happy endings do not last forever. Now they have to face the repercussions of their mistakes.

Is the past going to come back and haunt them?
Does it threaten to shatter their once-again perfect lives?
Will they stick together thick and thin as a family and persevere?

Nijangal 3
It’s been one year since Raj’s family overcame a tumultuous period of scandals, lies and a tragic death. But through thick and thin, they managed to stay together and came out of it unscathed – almost. But happy endings do not last forever. Now they have to face the repercussions of their mistakes.

Is the past going to come back and haunt them?
Does it threaten to shatter their once-again perfect lives?
Will they stick together thick and thin as a family and persevere?

References

Singapore Tamil dramas
2011 Tamil-language television series debuts
Tamil-language television shows
Vasantham TV original programming
Tamil-language television shows in Singapore
2014 Tamil-language television series endings